The 1958 Arkansas gubernatorial election was held on November 4, 1958.

Incumbent Democratic Governor Orval Faubus won election to a third term, defeating Republican nominee George W. Johnson with 82.47% of the vote. Faubus surged in popularity after denying the Little Rock Nine entrance to Central High School with the use of the Arkansas National Guard on September 4, 1957.

Primary elections
Primary elections were held on July 29, 1958. By winning over 50% of the vote, Faubus and Johnson avoided run-offs which would have been held on August 12, 1958.

Democratic primary

Candidates
Orval Faubus, incumbent Governor
Chris Finkbeiner, businessman
Lee Ward, judge

Results

Republican primary

Candidates
George W. Johnson, attorney
Donald D. Layne, civil engineer

Results

General election

Candidates
Orval Faubus, Democratic
George W. Johnson, Republican 

George W. Johnson, an attorney in Greenwood, Sebastian County, deliberately abandoned the race in September 1958. He traveled to his son's home in Isle, Minnesota. He told his family, "Mr. Faubus is a fine man and I support him whole-heartedly." He genuinely and naively believed that blacks were intellectually deficient and needed their own schools.

Results

References

Bibliography
 

1958
Arkansas
Gubernatorial
Arkansas gubernatorial election